The Comedy Jam is an American comedy and music show.  The Comedy Jam premiered on Comedy Central on March 22, 2017. In each episode, comedians perform a short stand up set, and then sing a cover song backed by a live band.

Development
The Comedy Jam first aired on Comedy Central as an hour long special called "The Goddamn Comedy Jam". Following the success of the special, the show was picked up to series. The show itself is based on a monthly live show, The Goddamn Comedy Jam, with a similar format, created by Josh Adam Meyers.

Production
The series is shot in Hollywood at The Fonda Theatre.

References

2010s American stand-up comedy television series
2017 American television series debuts
Comedy Central original programming